Franco Signorelli (born 1 January 1991) is a Venezuelan footballer who plays as a midfielder. He was awarded the award for the best goal in the Serie B 2011–12 season.

Club career
On 30 August 2019, he was released from his contract with Salernitana by mutual consent.

On 7 February 2020, he signed with Serie C club Vibonese until the end of the 2019–20 season.

On 21 August 2020 he joined newly promoted Serie C club Turris.

References

External links
 

1991 births
People from Mérida, Mérida
Living people
Venezuelan footballers
Venezuela international footballers
Venezuelan people of Italian descent
Association football midfielders
Serie A players
Serie B players
Serie C players
Liga I players
Empoli F.C. players
Ternana Calcio players
Spezia Calcio players
U.S. Salernitana 1919 players
FC Voluntari players
U.S. Vibonese Calcio players
S.S. Turris Calcio players
Venezuelan expatriate footballers
Expatriate footballers in Italy
Expatriate footballers in Romania
Venezuelan expatriate sportspeople in Italy
Venezuelan expatriate sportspeople in Romania